Bella was a Canadian indie pop band from Vancouver, active from 2003 to 2011.

History

Pretty Mess 
Initially, the band consisted of Cameron Fraser (guitar, bass, keyboards, vocals), Tiffany Garrett Sotomayor (drums, guitar, vocals), Matt Hutchings (guitar, keyboards, vocals) and Charla McCutcheon (keyboards}. In 2004, they released their debut album, Pretty Mess, which was recorded in Fraser's bedroom but mixed by Colin Stewart. Tom Harrison of The Province compared the band's sound to 1980s bands Martha and the Muffins and Altered Images. Music from this album was featured on CBC Radio 3 and on MuchMusic.

No One Will Know 
Bella was signed to Mint Records, and the second album, No One Will Know, produced by David Carswell and with contributions from Roddy Bottum (Faith No More), Will Schwartz (Imperial Teen), John Collins (the New Pornographers) and Jason Martin (Starflyer 59, was released in 2007. It received mostly positive reviews from music critics. In a favourable review of the album, the Edmonton Journal likened the band's sound to that of Tegan and Sara. Exclaim! called it "futuristic indie pop at its most danceable." No One Will Know reached the top ten of multiple alternative and college album charts in Canada.

Bella toured extensively and performed with The Breeders, Pretty Girls Make Graves, The New Pornographers, Phoenix, Imperial Teen, Viva Voce, 54-40, and The Organ, among others.

The band broke up in 2011, when Sotomayor moved to Barcelona and created the one-woman project 'That Girl With Dark Eyes'.

Discography
Pretty Mess (2004), Hideout Records
Bella/Columbus (2006, split with Columbus), Pop Echo Records
No One Will Know (2007), Mint Records

See also

Music of Canada
Canadian rock
List of bands from Canada

References

Musical groups established in 2003
Musical groups from Vancouver
Canadian indie pop groups
Mint Records artists
2003 establishments in British Columbia